Jānis Dukšinskis  (born 8 June 1963, Daugavpils) is a Latvian politician. He is a member of the LPP/LC and a deputy of the 9th Saeima (Latvian Parliament). He began his current term in parliament on November 7, 2006. He is currently a member of the Daugavpils City Council.

External links
Saeima website

1963 births
Living people
Politicians from Daugavpils
Latvian Way politicians
Latvia's First Party/Latvian Way politicians
Latgale Party politicians
Deputies of the 9th Saeima
University of Daugavpils alumni